Callum Hazzard (born 15 January 1999) is a professional rugby league footballer who plays as a  for the North Wales Crusaders in Betfred League 1.

Career

St Helens
Hazzard made his Super League début for Saints against the London Broncos in July 2019.

He has spent time on loan from Saints at the North Wales Crusaders in Betfed League 1.

North Wales Crusaders
It was announced on 14 November 2020 that Hazzard would make his move to the North Wales Crusaders permanent.

References

External links
St Helens profile
SL profile
Saints Heritage Society profile

1999 births
Living people
Rugby league locks
St Helens R.F.C. players
North Wales Crusaders players